Kristin Lisa Herrera (born February 21, 1989) is an American actress. She is best known for her role as Dana Cruz on the first season of the Nickelodeon series Zoey 101 and as Lourdes Del Torro on General Hospital.

Career
Herrera was born in Los Angeles, California on February 21, 1989. She has two older brothers and a sister, named Ryan, Justin and Ashley. She is of Mexican and Puerto Rican descent and speaks fluent Spanish. She attended Hillcrest Christian School in Granada Hills, Los Angeles.

Herrera has been acting in commercials since she was six. Her first TV role was in a phone service commercial. Other roles include Eleena on NYPD Blue, Aimee Varga on The Division, Sophie on The Bernie Mac Show, Katie on 7th Heaven and Frederika in ER.

In 2004, at 15, Herrera was cast as Dana Cruz in Zoey 101, Zoey Brooks (Jamie Lynn Spears) and Nicole Bristow's (Alexa Nikolas) roommate. After the first season, Herrera was unceremoniously written out from working on Zoey 101‘Allegedly’ because the producers thought she looked too old next to her co-stars, though it was never confirmed by Nickelodeon. It was also stated that there was bullying on set, where she pushed and harassed Nikolas. She was replaced by the character Lola Martinez (Victoria Justice).

She also co-starred in feature film Freedom Writers opposite Hilary Swank. In 2008, Herrera stopped taking acting roles. Her last acting role was on the soap opera General Hospital.

In 2020, she reunited with the Zoey 101 cast on the television show All That.

Personal life 
On July 15, 2016, Herrera announced via Instagram that she is engaged to long time partner, Daniel Novak. Their engagement ended shortly afterward. However, on February 14, 2020, she announced that she is engaged to Novak again. They got married on October 26, 2022.

In November 17, 2021 she announced on Instagram that she is pregnant with her first child. She gave birth to her child on May 23, 2022.

Filmography

Film roles

Television roles

References

Bibliography

External links
 
 

1989 births
Actresses from Los Angeles
American child actresses
American film actresses
American actresses of Mexican descent
American actresses of Puerto Rican descent
American people of Spanish descent
American soap opera actresses
American television actresses
Hispanic and Latino American actresses
Living people
20th-century American actresses
21st-century American actresses